Barreiras Airport  is the airport serving Barreiras, Brazil.

History
The airport was commissioned in 1940 and served as a strategic technical stop on the route Rio de Janeiro-Miami, enabling faster flights as compared with the ones operated via the coast. Furthermore, because of the existence of a river and a railway, fuel was easily transported to the site. During World War II the airport became a United States Air Force Base but after 1945 it returned to its original civil vocation.

Airlines and destinations

Access

See also

List of airports in Brazil

References

External links

Airports in Bahia
Airports established in 1940